The Virgin Mary as a Child Praying is a 1658–1660 painting by Francisco de Zurbarán, now in the Hermitage Museum in St Petersburg. Its theme is similar to that of his The Young Virgin (Metropolitan Museum of Art). The painter completed the work in Madrid a few years before his death.

References

1650s paintings
Paintings in the collection of the Hermitage Museum
Paintings by Francisco de Zurbarán
Paintings of the Virgin Mary